Sharkov is a Russian masculine surname, its feminine counterpart is Sharkova. It may refer to
Boris Sharkov (born 1950), Russian physicist
Olga Sharkova-Sidorova (born 1968), Russian fencer

See also
4074 Sharkov, a minor planet

Russian-language surnames